Lukáš Vantuch (born 20 July 1987 in Jihlava) is a Czech professional ice hockey player.

Vantuch previously played for Calgary Hitmen, Lethbridge Hurricanes, HC Vrchlabí, HC Benátky nad Jizerou and HC Bílí Tygři Liberec.

Career statistics

Regular season and playoffs

International

References

External links

Boston Bruins draft picks
Czech ice hockey forwards
Living people
1987 births
Sportspeople from Jihlava
Czech expatriate ice hockey players in Canada
Czech expatriate ice hockey players in Germany
Naturalized citizens of Germany